Grusonia pulchella (Engelm.) H.Rob., also known as sagebrush cholla, is a tuberous species of opuntioid cactus from the Mojave Desert of central Nevada, eastern California, northwestern Arizona and western Utah in the United States. Grusonia pulchella has at various times been included in Opuntia or placed in a separate genus Micropuntia.

Habitat
Grusonia pulchella grows in gravelly alluvial fans, often above salt flats or alkali basins. Specimens can be locally common, although they are difficult to locate, often growing under other shrubs such as shadscale.

Description
Grusonia pulchella differs from other North American opuntioid cacti in having a geophytic habit, where above-ground growth dies back to the crown in adverse conditions, and resprouts under more favorable conditions. Authors have described the underground storage structure as a "tuberous root" or true tuber. The above-ground stems are variable, being cylindrical to globular. The areoles bear flexible yellow spines and white wool. Overall, the above-ground growth can often form a cushion-plant habit. The flowers are bright magenta, and the fruits are dehiscent. The seeds are unique, with a groove running along the hilar surface.

References

Bibliography
 

pulchella
Cacti of the United States
Flora of the California desert regions
Flora of the Great Basin
Flora of Arizona
Flora of California
Flora of Nevada
Flora of Utah
Natural history of the Mojave Desert
Flora without expected TNC conservation status